Environa is a suburb and locality of Queanbeyan, located in the Queanbeyan–Palerang Regional Council, in New South Wales, Australia, west of Jerrabomberra Creek and nearby the New South Wales and Australian Capital Territory border. The suburb was historically designated as a planned community that subsequently did not come to fruition, however, Environa has since been allocated as part of the South Jerrabomerra development of Queanbeyan for proposed development, including the proposed developments of Tralee and Poplars.

History

The land itself was originally a subdivision of the grazing property known as Hill Station. It lies just east of the Queanbeyan-Cooma railway line as it goes past the industrial estate of Hume, ACT.

Henry Ferdinand Halloran, an enterprising realtor bought the property at auction in 1924 and began planning the future city. Halloran emphasised the future promise of the region, with the closest freehold (Torrens title) land to the federal territory.

Plans for the northern part of the subdivision, called Canberra Freehold Estate, included space for offices, shops, a hospital, and theatres.  Some of the street names were Rue de Paris, Piazza di Roma and Tokio Dori.  On the southern part of the estate, Halloran built stone monuments.  These included an arch at the entrance, rows of stone pillars along the entrance route, and a statue of Henry Parkes on a tall column.  Bandstands were built, which had corrugated iron roof supported by tree trunks, and a platform.  The main top-mast off HMAS Sydney was erected, but rotted at the base and collapsed.  This was later moved to Jervis Bay.

No blocks were ever sold and the planned development never went ahead with the Great Depression killing off the project. The Queanbeyan Council resumed the land to the north, because of unpaid rates, and it later became part of South Queanbeyan. Henry Halloran died in 1953 after 84 years of life and the property at Environa was inherited by his daughter Mrs Joyce Larcombe. A house was built there in 1971. Halloran's company Reality Realizations still controlled extensive landholdings around Queanbeyan into the 1970s.

Between 1926 and 1956, there was a railway station, just the north of Environa, on the Bombala railway line. It was named Letchworth, after Letchworth Garden City. The name was suggested by H. F. Halloran. It was closer to another unrealised Halloran sub-division, Letchworth, but would have also served Environa, if the sub-division had been developed.

The originally planned—never constructed—street layout of Environa has been marked on Google Maps and Apple Maps. It was still visible at a high level of zoom, in early 2021. However, this will very likely change, due to the major development works associated the South Jerrabomberra development, which have commenced, at Tralee, just south-east of the locality of Environa. A new main road, Environa Drive, is being constructed, which will link the newly developed area to Tompsitt Drive. A reason that the area has remained undeveloped for so long was the concern that any housing would be affected adversely by aircraft noise, if Canberra Airport were expanded.

Geography
Environa lies on the lower slopes of the Pemberton Hill to the south. The rocks are acid volcanics, rhyodacite and rhyolite from the Deakin Volcanics. These rocks solidified 414±9 Mya.

References

Towns in New South Wales
Planned cities in Australia
Proposed populated places in Australia
Southern Tablelands